The Colorado Charter School Institute is an independent agency of the Colorado Department of Education and is the only independent, statewide charter school authorizer in the state of Colorado in the United States.

History
The Legislature created the State Charter School Institute in 2004.

Role
Like the already existing school district authorizers, CSI was created with the authority to approve or deny charter applications, set expectations and oversee performance for its own charter schools, and determine whether to renew or close a school based on its performance. 

CSI is authorized to accept applications for schools (1) in districts without exclusive chartering authority (ECA) and (2) in districts which have retained ECA, with permission to the applicant from the district's board of education. CSI accepts applications from those interested in starting a new charter school as well as those interested in expanding or replicating an existing charter school or transferring from another district. Over 2/3 of charter schools authorized by CSI are located in districts that have retained exclusive chartering authority.

Leadership
CSI is governed by a nine-member Board of Directors: seven members are appointed by the Governor and two by the Commissioner of Education.

Charter school accountability
CSI uses guidance from the National Association of Charter School Authorizers (NACSA) for performance frameworks.

Model authorizing practices
CSI is called out in statute to assist districts in implementing authorizing best practices.

See also

Colorado Department of Education
List of school districts in Colorado
List of charter schools in Colorado

References

External links
Charter School Institute
Colorado Department of Education

 
School districts established in 2004
2004 establishments in Colorado